Mia Terese Hundvin (born 7 March 1977) is a former Norwegian handball player.

Career
Hundvin played 73 matches for Norway's national handball team in addition to playing for professional clubs. She was part of national teams that won the European Women's Handball Championship in 1998, the World Women's Handball Championship in 1999, and Olympic bronze in 2000. Hundvin scored the game-winner as Norway beat South Korea, 22-21.

She became pregnant by partner Terje Haakonsen in 2003, which interrupted her playing for the Danish team Aalborg DH. In addition to her handball career, Hundvin has been training to be a photographer and works for Danish television.

In 2002, she starred in an episode in the Danish sit-com Langt fra Las Vegas. The episode is called "Mia Hundvin".

Personal life
In 2000, she entered a registered partnership with Danish handball player Camilla Andersen, but the couple split three years later. Sports Illustrated ran a lengthy feature on the two, who are much-discussed celebrities in their countries. According to Sports Illustrated, Andersen had been the lover of handball legend Anja Andersen after they won the gold for Denmark in 1996.

After her split from Andersen, Hundvin moved in with Norwegian snowboarder Terje Haakonsen, the world's top snowboarder in the 1990s. The couple have two children.

See also
 Eirik Hundvin, her father

References

1977 births
Living people
Bisexual sportspeople
Handball players at the 2000 Summer Olympics
Norwegian LGBT sportspeople
LGBT handball players
Norwegian female handball players
Norwegian expatriate sportspeople in Denmark
Expatriate handball players
Olympic bronze medalists for Norway
Olympic handball players of Norway
Olympic medalists in handball
Sportspeople from Bergen
Bisexual women
Medalists at the 2000 Summer Olympics